Phoebe Farris (also published as Pheobe Farris-Dufrene) is an art therapist, author, editor, artist, academic, photographer, free lance arts critic, and curator. Farris received  Fulbright and National Endowment of the Humanities grants and was named a Rockefeller Scholar in Residence. She was a resident at Harvard University’s Institute on the Arts and Civic Dialogue and at the Women’s Leadership Institute at Mills College, she earned an international reputation in the field of women’s studies. She  identifies as a Powhatan-Renape/Pamunkey Native American.

Life 
Farris received a Bachelor’s degree in fine arts from the City University of New York, a Master’s degree in art therapy from Pratt Institute and a doctorate in art education from the University of Maryland.

She taught at Purdue University for 22 years, and is now a professor emerita. The Phoebe Farris papers are held in the Purdue University Libraries, Archives and Special Collections. She has regularly authored articles in Cultural Survival Quarterly.

Farris has exhibited her documentary photography all over the world and curated traveling exhibits, including Visual Power: 21st Century Native American Artists/Intellectuals for the US Department of State. Since the 1980's, the subjects of her work have focused on documentation of contemporary Native American culture east of the Mississippi River and in the Caribbean.

Phoebe Farris is the Contributing Arts Editor for Cultural Survival Quarterly.  
Farris is also  a free lance writer for the National Museum of the American magazine. Their Vol.20 No.1, Spring 2019 issue features her article," Virginia's Pivotal Year: Four Centuries of American Evolution".
Phoebe Farris's photography and her 2015 essay, "Arts and Activism: Defining Homeland" can be found in the catalog for the international exhibition, "The Map is Not the Territory:Parallel Paths-Palestinians, Native Americans, Irish".

Published work 

 Art Therapy And Psychotherapy: Blending Two Therapeutic Approaches
 Voices of Color: Art and Society in the Americas
  
 Mentors of Diversity

References 

Art therapists
Mills College faculty
Purdue University faculty
Pamunkey people
Women's studies academics
Living people
Year of birth missing (living people)
21st-century Native Americans